This is a list of films produced by and released under the Walt Disney Pictures banner (known as that since 1983, with Never Cry Wolf as its first release) and films released before that under the former name of the parent company, Walt Disney Productions (1929–1983). Most films listed here were distributed theatrically in the United States by the company's distribution division, Walt Disney Studios Motion Pictures, formerly known as Buena Vista Film Distribution Company (1953–1960), Buena Vista Distribution Company (1960–1987) and Buena Vista Pictures Distribution (1987–2007). The Disney features produced before The Living Desert (1953) were originally distributed by United Artists and RKO Radio Pictures, and are now distributed by Walt Disney Studios Motion Pictures. Some films produced by Walt Disney Pictures are also released through the parent company's streaming service, Disney+.

This list is organized by release date and includes live-action feature films (including theatrical, direct-to-video and streaming releases), animated feature films (including films developed and produced by Walt Disney Animation Studios and Pixar Animation Studios) and documentary films (including titles from the True-Life Adventures series). For an exclusive list of animated films released by Walt Disney Pictures and its previous entities see List of Disney theatrical animated feature films and List of Disney feature-length home entertainment releases § Animated films.

This list is only for films released under the main Disney banner. It does not include films produced or released by other existing, defunct or divested labels or subsidiaries owned by Walt Disney Studios (i.e. Marvel Studios, Lucasfilm, 20th Century Studios, Searchlight Pictures, Disneynature, Fox 2000 Pictures, Touchstone Pictures, Hollywood Pictures, National Geographic Documentary Films, Miramax Films, Dimension Films, ESPN Films, etc.) unless they are credited as co-production partners, nor any direct-to-video releases unless they were produced under the main Disney banner, TV films, theatrical re-releases or films originally released by other non-Disney studios.

All films listed are theatrical releases and/or American-based films unless specified.
 A ‡ symbol signifies a direct-to-video or streaming release exclusively through Disney+.
 A † symbol signifies a premium video on demand release through Disney+.
 A § symbol signifies a simultaneous release to theatres and on premium video on demand.
 A * symbol signifies a film not produced in the United States, but rather in another country.

Released

1930s–1940s

1950s

1960s

1970s

1980s

1990s

2000s

2010s

2020s

Upcoming

Unspecified films with dates
These films are unspecified but have confirmed dates from The Walt Disney Studios.

Undated films

See also

In-depth lists by other types
 List of Disney feature-length home entertainment releases
 List of Disney television films
 List of Disney theatrical animated feature films
 List of Disney live-action adaptations and remakes of Disney animated films
 List of Disney park ride adaptations

Disney-branded labels

 Lists of Walt Disney Studios films

Operating:
 Walt Disney Animation Studios (list)
 Disney Channel Original Movies (list)
 Pixar Animation Studios (list)
 Disneynature

Defunct:
 ImageMovers Digital
 Skellington Productions
 Disneytoon Studios

Other film labels and/or subsidiaries

Operating:
 Marvel Studios (list) 
 Marvel Cinematic Universe (list) 
 Marvel Television
 Lucasfilm Ltd. 
 20th Century Studios (list) 
 Searchlight Pictures
 20th Century Animation
 Star Studios
 ESPN Films 
 Star Studios 

Defunct:
 Hollywood Pictures 
 Touchstone Pictures (list) 
 ABC Motion Pictures (list) 
 ABC Family (list) 
 Fox 2000 Pictures
 Blue Sky Studios (list)
 UTV Motion Pictures 

Divested (once owned by Disney):
 Miramax (list) 
 Dimension Films (list) 

Related lists
 List of Walt Disney Animation Studios short films
 List of Disney television series

Notes

References

Further reading
 
 
 
 List of all films released by Disney regardless of label—Disney
 List of Pre-1980 Live Action Disney Movies and DVD Status—UltimateDisney.com
 List of 1980–Present Live Action Disney Movies and DVD Status—UltimateDisney.com

External links
 Official list of Walt Disney Pictures films

 
Disney feature films
Lists of films released by Disney
Films
American films by studio

sv:Lista över Disneyfilmer#Spelfilmer